Galaxy Mall is an eight floors shopping center located in Surabaya, Indonesia. The mall was founded in January 1996.

History 
Galaxy Mall 1 (former called Mal Galaxy) built in 1994. One year later, the construction was completed and opened in January 1996. At the time, the shopping center was managed by PT. Sinar Galaxy. The main tenants at that time were Hero Supermarket, Timezone, Keris Department Store, McDonald's and Galaxy 21. Galaxy Mall also has Techno Zone (computer and handphone center) to date, on the 2nd floor, the food court of the archipelago and internationally (now Food Galaxy) in 3rd floor. In 2005, Galaxy Mall developed, expanded and added one extension, namely Galaxy Mall 2 with the main tenants Sogo Department Store and Celebrity Fitness, completed and opened in 2006. In the same year, Hero Supermarket at Galaxy Mall 1 (the old Galaxy Mall building which opened in 1996), is now occupied by an international supermarket, which is 99 Ranch Market. In 2010, the name of the shopping center changed to Galaxy Mall because many residents in Surabaya mentioned the name and in the same year, the Galaxy 21 cinema was transformed into the Galaxy XXI cinema. In 2011, the first and only Centro Department Store in Surabaya was opened at Galaxy Mall 1. In 2013, Pull&Bear and Stradivarius opened their first outlets in Surabaya, precisely at Galaxy Mall 2. In the same year, McDonald's at Galaxy Mall 1, 2nd floor was closed and is now occupied by Erafone Megastore. While McDonald's at Galaxy Mall 1, 2nd floor moved its location to Jalan Manyar Kertoarjo, precisely at the former Pertamina gas station.

In 2016, construction of Galaxy Mall 3 has begun. On July 10, 2018, an elevated bridge was installed connecting Galaxy Mall 1 and 2 with Galaxy Mall 3. Furthermore, this bridge also functions as a crossing bridge for people equipped with their own elevators, and will also be integrated with rapid transportation, namely the monorail implemented by the city government Surabaya. On April 19, 2019, Galaxy Mall 3 was completed and opened with H&M, Uniqlo and Burger King as one of its main tenants. On March 31, 2022, furniture and electronic store Informa opened at Galaxy Mall 1, replacing now-defunct Centro Department Store. On September 3, 2022, a retail store from China, KKV, opened its 9th store and first store with two floors in Indonesia, at Galaxy Mall 3, 1st and 2nd floor.

Controversy 
After Galaxy Mall 3 construction was finished in 2019, rumors circulated that the next Galaxy Mall will also have a 4th stage. Galaxy Mall 4, according to rumors, will be built in an area currently occupied by sports facilities owned by the Indonesian National Sports Committee (KONI) of East Java. According to news circulating as well, the current location of the KONI facility will be moved to vacant land in Puri Galaxy housing on Jalan Arief Rahman Hakim, which is quite strategic because it is close to the campus of the Sepuluh Nopember Institute of Technology and Hang Tuah University.

References

External links 

 Galaxy Mall Surabaya di Facebook
 Situs resmi Centro

Shopping malls in Surabaya
Tourist attractions in East Java
Skyscraper office buildings in Indonesia
Skyscrapers in Surabaya